Acanthophyllum cerastioides, the chickweed baby's-breath, is a perennial plant of the family Caryophyllaceae, found in Bangladesh, Bhutan, North India, Nepal, North Pakistan, and Sikkim, with a typical height of 10–27 cm. Recent molecular studies show this species is a member of the genus Acanthophyllum rather than Gypsophila.

References

Caryophyllaceae
Plants described in 1825